Ekenbabu (Mr. Eken) is a Bengali detective fictional character created by author Sujan Dasgupta. The first story of Ekenbabu, Manhatane Moonstone was published in Anandamela in 1991.

Character
Ekenbabu is a police detective who looks like a very common Bengali man. He studied criminology in the USA. His real name is Ekendra Sen. He is eccentric, little comical and takes snuffs. He is a man with a sweet smile, a bald head and a round face. Although he is a government employee, he likes to solve cases in his own style unlike a typical investigator. As per the writer, Eken's friend, Professor Bapi writes the stories of Ekenbabu.

Books
 Manhattane Moonstone
 Dhaka Rahasyo Unmochito
 Puraskar Panch Hajar Doller
 Khuner Agey Khun
 Ekenbabu O Keyadidi
 Sankhayar sanket
 Manhattane Manhaunt
 Asol Khunir Sandhane
 Santiniketane Osanti
 Ekenbabu Samgra (Part I-V)

Film adaptation
Eken Babu web series is a comedy-detective series which was first released on 3 March 2018 with 6 episodes directed by Anirban Mallik. Later on 10 November 2018, Hoichoi released the second season of the web series but the second series was directed by Anupam Hari. The third series was directed by Abhijit Chowdhury. Actor Anirban Chakraborty played the role of Ekenbabu. A film, The Eken released on 8 April 2022, directed by Joydip Mukherjee. Anirban Chakraborty played the title role.

Radio adaptation

Radio Mirchi Kolkata station aired Manhattan-ey Moonstone for Mirchi's Sunday Suspense Programme. Eken Babu was voiced by RJ Deep, Bapi by RJ Somak, Abinash by Sayak Aman, Sailen Sapui by RJ Mir, Pramatha by Agni and the story was narrated by RJ Deep.

References

Culture of Kolkata
Fictional Indian people
Fictional Bengali people
Novel series by featured character
Fictional amateur detectives